Danial Synagogue or Daniel Synagogue also known as Polish Synagogue  ( - Kenise Lahestāni-hā) is the only Ashkenazi synagogue in Iran. It is located at 30 Tir Street (formerly known as Ghavam Al Saltaneh Street), in Tehran.

It was mainly used during the time of the Second World War by Polish Jewish refugees. With the increase in Jewish refugees from Poland in 1940, Iranian Jews decided to build a specific Ashkenazi synagogue next to the Haim Synagogue.

When the Danial Synagogue was first opened it could hold sixty people. Three Ashkenazi-designed Torahs had been brought from Poland and were used in the synagogue. After the Iranian Revolution, most Ashkenazi Jews left Iran, so the synagogue is now mainly used by Iranian Jews.

See also 
Polish refugees in Iran

References 

Ashkenazi Jewish culture in the Middle East
Ashkenazi synagogues
European diaspora in Iran
Polish diaspora in Asia
Polish-Jewish diaspora
Synagogues in Tehran
Orthodox synagogues
Orthodox Judaism in the Middle East
Buildings and structures in Tehran
Iran–Poland relations